Marriage for One Night is a 1953 West German comedy film directed by Viktor Tourjansky and starring Gustav Fröhlich, Hannelore Bollmann and Adrian Hoven. It was shot at the Carlton Studios in Munich. The film's sets were designed by the art directors Ernst H. Albrecht and Arne Flekstad.

Cast
 Gustav Fröhlich as Pedro
 Hannelore Bollmann as Helga
 Adrian Hoven as Komma
 Gunnar Möller as Putzi
 Ingrid Pan as Jutta
 Katharina Mayberg as Anita
 Hans Leibelt as Hans Hoppe
 Rudolf Schündler as Turnegger
 Viktor Afritsch as Schauspieler
 Laya Raki as Tänzerin / Dancer
 Fritz Lafontaine as Rundfunkreporter
 Horst Winter as Jonny Reiner / Singer

References

Bibliography 
 Hans-Michael Bock and Tim Bergfelder. The Concise Cinegraph: An Encyclopedia of German Cinema. Berghahn Books, 2009.

External links 
 

1953 films
1953 comedy films
German comedy films
West German films
1950s German-language films
Films directed by Victor Tourjansky
Films with screenplays by Karl Georg Külb
German black-and-white films
1950s German films